Bandundu Airport   is an airport serving Bandundu, capital of the Kwilu Province in the Democratic Republic of the Congo.

The Bandundu non-directional beacon (Ident: BAN) is located on the field.

Airlines and destinations

Passenger

Cargo
 Cargo Bull Aviation

Accidents and incidents
Two occurrences are reported to have occurred on 17 July 2007 at Bandundu. The reports may refer to the same occurrence with factual errors:
 In one report, a Let-410UVP, tail number 9Q-CIM of Cargo Bull Aviation suffered a bird strike and crashed with no injuries but aircraft written off.
 In the other report an Antonov (either an An-24 or An-32) that had stopped en route from Kinshasa N'Dolo Airport to Nioki Airport lost its number 1 engine during initial climb and crashed  from Bandundu with substantial damage but no injuries. Another report has this occurring the next day with a minor injury to an Austrian pilot.  Another identifies the operator as Malift Air, the date as 18 July, the failure as an engine explosion during landing, and the aircraft destroyed.

In 2010, a Let-410 of Filair crashed near the airfield.

See also
Transport in Democratic Republic of the Congo
List of airports in Democratic Republic of the Congo

References

External links
OpenStreetMap - Bandundu
OurAirports - Bandundu Airport
SkyVector - Bandundu Airport
FallingRain - Bandundu Airport

Airports in Kwilu Province